Porotos con rienda (English: beans with reins) is a typical Chilean dish made of boiled beans with spaghetti, chorizo, diced pumpkin, chili, and onions.

Chilean cuisine
Legume dishes